The David School is a non-denominational private high school for underprivileged and struggling students in David, Kentucky, a rural village in the Appalachian Mountains in the United States.

History

The school was started in the 1970s by Danny Greene, originally from New York City, who moved to David as a college sophomore and was moved by the rampant poverty and illiteracy there.

Kentucky's Attorney General conducted an investigation, beginning in 2011, into Greene's alleged mismanagement. Upon presentation of the evidence, in May 2012, Floyd County Circuit Judge, Johnny Ray Harris, assigned a new school board. The ruling also banned Greene and Sister Emma Kriz, the former principal, from any further school involvement.

The school's campus was built largely with volunteer labor and many of the workers at the David School are technically long-term volunteers rather than employees and are provided with a small stipend and housing.

Country Boys
The David School was featured in the classic six-hour documentary series Country Boys which was broadcast in Frontline on the PBS network in 2006. Filmmaker David Sutherland spent 3 years at the David School chronicling the lives of two at-risk adolescents, Cody Perkins and Chris Johnson, following their lives as they grapple with and overcome daunting emotional and physical obstacles related to their unique family lives and the economic situation of this region.

References

External links
 

Private high schools in Kentucky
Schools in Floyd County, Kentucky
Educational institutions established in 1974
1974 establishments in Kentucky